Carl Adolph Rothe (8 December 1767 – 12 July 1834) was a naval officer in the Royal Danish Navy and governor of the Danish West Indies from 1820 to 1822.

Biography
Rothe was born on 8 December 1767 in Tybjerggård on Zealand, Denmark, to parents Tyge Jesper Rothe and Karen Bjørn. The Rothe family originates from Germany, coming to Denmark in the end of the 17th century. On 12 January 1811 he married Benedicte Ulfsparre de Tuxen (1790-1877) in Helsingør, the daughter of Louis de Tuxen and Charlotte Elisabeth Klingfeldt. The couple had no less than eight children: Louis, Anna Rosine, Andrea Bjørn, Karen, Charlotte Elisabeth, Martha Gustava, Margrethe Christine and Louise.

Rothe joined the Danish navy as a naval volunteer (cadet) in 1778 and on 2 April 1783 he was commissioned as an officer in the rank of a Second Lieutenant. In his naval career Rothe, fought in the Battle of Copenhagen in 1801 against the British fleet, commanding the ship (pram) Nyborg. He was promoted to the rank of Captain in 1806, and served as the second in command of the ship Prinds Christian Frederik under command of captain Carl W. Jessen from 24 December 1807. He participated in the battle of Battle of Zealand Point on 22 March 1808, which he survived as the second in command of Prinds Christian Frederik. After that battle, in which he was wounded, he spent two months as an English prisoner of war in Göteborg, Sweden.

He was promoted to the rank of Counter Admiral as of 16 April 1833. From 11 November 1808 until 25 July 1814 Carl was governor of Bornholm and Christiansø, and was the governor of the Virgin Islands in the Danish West Indies from 1820 to 1822. He died, 66 years old, in Copenhagen on 12 July 1834. He is buried in Holmens Cemetery.

Notes

Further reading
Johnny Balsved's website about Danish Naval History (website's last update August 11, 2008 as viewed on August 14, 2008)
Oil painting of Carl Adolph Rothe is available on the Reventlow family website. Christian Ditlev Reventlow, Slægten Reventlow (last modified July 20, 2008 as viewed on August 14, 2008)

Governors of the Danish West Indies
1767 births
1834 deaths
19th century in the Danish West Indies
19th-century Danish politicians